Cahill is an Irish surname.

Cahill may also refer to:

 Cahill (group), a house music group from Liverpool
 21410 Cahill, a minor planet
 Cahill Expressway, Sydney, Australia
 Cahill Racing, Indy car racing team
 Cahill Stadium, Summerside, Prince Edward Island, Canada
 Cahill U.S. Marshal, 1973 American Western film
 "Cahill" (Space Ghost Coast to Coast), a television episode

See also
 Cahill ministry (disambiguation)
 McCahill, a surname